Peter Gunda (born 3 July 1973) is a retired Slovak football defender.

References

1973 births
Living people
Slovak footballers
FC Nitra players
AC Sparta Prague players
FK Dukla Banská Bystrica players
FK Jablonec players
FK Viktoria Žižkov players
ŠK Slovan Bratislava players
FC DAC 1904 Dunajská Streda players
SC Eisenstadt players
SC Ritzing players
Association football defenders
Slovakia under-21 international footballers
Slovak expatriate footballers
Expatriate footballers in the Czech Republic
Slovak expatriate sportspeople in the Czech Republic
Expatriate footballers in Austria
Slovak expatriate sportspeople in Austria